The Days / Nights EP is a two-track extended play by Swedish record producer and DJ Avicii. It was released on 1 December 2014 through PRMD. It resulted in two main single releases: "The Days" and "The Nights".

A vinyl edition of the EP was released for Record Store Day in 2015, limited to 1300 copies. It includes all extended Beatport mixes and the remixes from The Days / Nights EP: Remixes

Track listing

References

2014 EPs
Avicii albums